La Provence is a French language daily newspaper published in Marseille, France.

History and profile
In 1997 La Provence was created in Marseille from the merger of two daily newspapers, Le Provençal of former Interior Minister Gaston Defferre and the Le Méridional of shipowner and congressman, Jean Alfred Fraissinet.

La Provence was jointly owned by the Groupe Hersant Média and the Groupe Bernard Tapie until July 2013 when the latter became the sole owner of the paper. The publisher of the paper is Hachette Filipacchi Medias, a subsidiary of Lagardère.

In 2020, the circulation of La Provence was of 81,858 copies.

See also

 List of newspapers in France

References

External links
 Official website

1997 establishments in France
Newspapers established in 1997
Daily newspapers published in France
Mass media in Marseille